Kas Nazan or Kasnazan may refer to:
 Kas Nazan, Divandarreh
 Kas Nazan, Saqqez